Timothy David Donnelly (September 3, 1944 – September 17, 2021) was an American film and television actor. He was perhaps best known for playing the role as fireman Chet Kelly in NBC's Emergency!.

Life and career 
Donnelly was born in Los Angeles on September 3, 1944, as the son of Eileen, a homemaker and Paul, an assistant director. His maternal grandfather was actor J. Pat O'Malley. He began his career in 1957,  appearing in the film Baby Face Nelson. Later in his career, Donnelly appeared in films and television programs, as his credits include Hawaii Five-O, The Secret of Santa Vittoria, Adam-12, The Legend of Jesse James and The Virginian. He also appeared in Dragnet for five episodes, in which he was mentored by Jack Webb.

Donnelly later won the role of fireman Chet Kelly in Emergency!, when he auditioned in casting. After he won the role, Donnelly had to cut some of his hair and shave his beard. After the series ended in 1977, he played starring roles in films Parts: The Clonus Horror and his brother's Dennis Donnelly 1978 film The Toolbox Murders. Donnelly retired from acting in 1984, last appearing in the action-adventure television series The A-Team.

Death 
Donnelly died from complications of surgery at his home in Santa Fe, New Mexico, on September 17, 2021, at the age of 77.

References

External links 

1944 births
2021 deaths
Male actors from Los Angeles
American male film actors
American male television actors
20th-century American male actors